Sam Parsons (born 23 August 1995) is a badminton player from England. Parsons started playing badminton at age five. In 2014, he was the finalist in the English National Badminton Championships in the men's singles event and in 2015 the winner of this event.

Achievements

BWF International Challenge/Series (5 titles, 1 runner-up) 
Men's singles

Men's doubles

  BWF International Challenge tournament
  BWF International Series tournament
  BWF Future Series tournament

References

External links 
 

1995 births
Living people
Sportspeople from Coventry
English male badminton players